The list of University of Szeged people includes notable graduates and nongraduates; professors; and administrators affiliated with the University of Szeged, located in Szeged, Hungary.

See also

 List of Hungarian people

References

External links 
 Scientists of the University of Szeged (in Hungarian)

List
University of Szeged
Szeged